Melette is a mountain massif in the Veneto region in Northern Italy. Its highest peak is 1,824 metres.

The main summits of the massif are:
 Monte Fior 1824 m
 Monte Spil 1808 m
 Monte Miela 1782 m
 Monte Castelgomberto 1771 m
 Monte Meletta Davanti 1704 m
 Monte Meletta di Gallio 1676 m
 Monte Tondarecar 1673 m

Mountains of Veneto